Beška Bridge crosses the Danube river near Beška, Serbia on the A1 motorway, part of the European route E75. It consists of two identical prestressed concrete constructions, the first being completed in 1975 and the second in 2011. With 2,205 m total length, it is the longest bridge over the Danube. 

The first bridge was designed by architect Branko Žeželj, who also designed Belgrade Fair – Hall 1, Žeželj Bridge and the Prokop station. It was built by Mostogradnja from 1971 to 1975. It was bombed twice and partly destroyed during the NATO bombing of Serbia on 1 April and 21 April 1999, but it was temporarily fixed soon after the bombing was over and reopened on 19 July 1999, as it is an important part of the E75.

A twin new bridge for northbound traffic was built right next to the old one between 2008 and 2011, by a consortium led by Austrian group Alpine Bau, and was opened on October 3, 2011. After its opening, the old bridge was closed for reconstruction, to be finally opened for the designated traffic in August 2014. The total contracted value of the works was €33.7 million, and it was financed from an EBRD loan.

The bridge carries a full motorway profile, having two traffic lanes, hard shoulder lane and two pedestrian lanes.

See also
 List of bridges in Serbia
 List of crossings of the Danube

References

External links

 https://web.archive.org/web/20080831060234/http://www.yu-build.com/main/f/063/063.html
 http://www.plovput.rs/plovni_put_mostovi_full_1232.htm
Aerial video of the Beška Bridge

Road bridges in Serbia
Transport in Vojvodina
Bridges completed in 1975
Bridges completed in 2011
Bridges over the Danube